Alireza Khamseh is an Iranian cinema and television actor.

Selected filmography

 Paytakht
 Rich and Poor
 Love is not Closed
 Man of Many Faces
 Once Upon a Time
Standardized Patient
Pickpockets Don't Go to Heaven 
Twenty

References

External links 

1953 births
Iranian male film actors
Iranian male stage actors
Iranian male television actors
Living people
People from Tehran
Shahid Beheshti University alumni
Iranian radio and television presenters
Crystal Simorgh for Best Supporting Actor winners